Pato is a sport similar to polo played on horseback.

Pato may also refer to:

Geography
 Pato, Nepal, a village development committee
 Cañón del Pato (Duck Canyon), Peru
 El Pato Air Base, Peru

People

Given name
 Pato Banton (born 1961), English reggae singer and toaster
 Pato Kakaraya, politician in Papua New Guinea
 Pato Hoffmann (born 1956), Bolivian actor and theater director

Surname
 Chus Pato (born 1955), Galician writer and political activist
 Cristina Pato (born 1980), Galician bagpiper, pianist and composer
 Gladys Lomafu Pato (born 1930), Swazi short story writer
 Rimbink Pato, Papua New Guinean constitutional lawyer and politician

Nickname or stage name
Alexandre Pato (born 1989), Brazilian footballer
Pato O'Ward (born 1999), Mexican racing driver
Pato Roberto Abbondanzieri (born 1972), Argentine former football goalkeeper
Pato Ousmane Barry (born 1991), Guinean footballer
Pato Patricio Margetic (born 1960), Argentine former footballer
Pato Claudio Strunz (born 1971), Argentine thrash metal drummer
Pato Roland Vargas-Aguilera (born 1979), Bolivian footballer
Pato Patrice Wilson, Nigerian-American music producer, singer and songwriter
el Pato ("the Duck") Juan Manuel Silva Argentine racing driver
el Pato ("the Duck") Patricio Galaz
el Pato ("the Duck") Ángel Cabrera (born 1969), Argentine professional golfer
el Pato ("the Duck") Ubaldo Fillol (born 1950), Argentine football goalkeeper

Other uses
 Tervakosken Pato, a football club based in Tervakoski, Finland
 AVE Class 102, a high-speed train nicknamed "Pato" in Spanish
 Pato, a character in Pocoyo, a Spanish children's show
 "Pato", a song by Kafu Banton

See also
 Patos (disambiguation)

Lists of people by nickname